Bulgaria originally planned to participate in the Eurovision Song Contest 2020 with the song "Tears Getting Sober" written by Victoria Georgieva, Borislav Milanov, Lukas Oscar Janisch and Cornelia Wiebols. The song was performed by Victoria, which is the artistic name of singer Victoria Georgieva. In October 2019, the Bulgarian broadcaster Bulgarian National Television (BNT) announced that they would be returning to the Eurovision Song Contest after a one-year absence following their withdrawal in 2019 due to financial difficulties. On 25 November 2019, the broadcaster announced that Victoria had been selected to compete at the 2019 contest in Rotterdam, Netherlands. The song that Victoria competed with, "Tears Getting Sober", was also internally selected and was presented to the public on 7 March 2020.

Bulgaria was drawn to compete in the second semi-final of the Eurovision Song Contest which took place on 14 May 2020. However, the contest was cancelled due to the COVID-19 pandemic.

Background 

The nation achieved their best result in the contest in 2017 with the song "Beautiful Mess" performed by Kristian Kostov, which placed second. To this point, only four Bulgarian entries had managed to have qualified to the Eurovision final; the nation had failed to qualify to the final with their other eight entries. In 2018, Equinox and their song "Bones" qualified to the final and placed fourteenth.

The Bulgarian national broadcaster, Bulgarian National Television (BNT), broadcasts the event within Bulgaria and organises the selection process for the nation's entry. In the past, BNT had alternated between both internal selections and national finals in order to select the Bulgarian entry. In October 2018, the Bulgarian broadcaster announced that the country would not participate in 2019 citing financial difficulties as the reason for their decision. Following their one-year absence, BNT confirmed Bulgaria's participation in the 2020 Eurovision Song Contest on 31 October 2019. For their 2020 entry, the broadcaster internally selected the Bulgarian entry, a selection procedure that was used between 2016 and 2018.

Before Eurovision

Internal selection
On 25 November 2019, BNT announced during a press conference that they had internally selected Victoria Georgieva to represent Bulgaria in Rotterdam. Victoria previously participated in the fourth season of X Factor Bulgaria where she placed sixth. Her song "Tears Getting Sober" was internally selected and presented on 7 March 2020 through the release of the official music video via the official Eurovision Song Contest's YouTube channel. The song was written by members of the songwriting team Symphonix International which had been responsible for the Bulgarian entries from 2016 onwards: Borislav Milanov, Lukas Oscar Janisch, Cornelia Wiebols, as well as Victoria herself. In regards to the song, Victoria stated: "It tells a story about overcoming your fears and pain and moving forward. We don't speak often about the mental health problems our generation faces and this song aims to inspire them and to give them hope."

At Eurovision
According to Eurovision rules, all nations with the exceptions of the host country and the "Big Five" (France, Germany, Italy, Spain and the United Kingdom) are required to qualify from one of two semi-finals in order to compete for the final; the top ten countries from each semi-final progress to the final. The European Broadcasting Union (EBU) split up the competing countries into six different pots based on voting patterns from previous contests, with countries with favourable voting histories put into the same pot. On 28 January 2020, a special allocation draw was held which placed each country into one of the two semi-finals, as well as which half of the show they would perform in. Bulgaria was placed into the second semi-final, to be held on 14 May 2020, and was scheduled to perform in the second half of the show. However, due to the COVID-19 pandemic, the contest was cancelled.

Prior to the Eurovision Song Celebration YouTube broadcast in place of the semi-finals, it was revealed that Bulgaria was set to perform in position 17, following the entry from Georgia and before the entry from Latvia.

References

External links

2020
Countries in the Eurovision Song Contest 2020
Eurovision